Daniel Robert Schlereth (born May 9, 1986) is an American former professional baseball pitcher who played in Major League Baseball (MLB) for the Arizona Diamondbacks and Detroit Tigers. He is currently the pitching coach for the Western Michigan Broncos.

Early years
Schlereth was born in Anchorage, Alaska, before moving to Highlands Ranch, Colorado. He is a graduate of Highlands Ranch High School. During his senior year, he struck out a school record 19 batters in a single game. He was named to the top 50 All-Star game players his senior year. He also played quarterback for the football team and broke the school rushing record in a single season by a QB and had the longest run from scrimmage in school history, 96 yards. He was named Colorado Gatorade Offensive Player of the Year his senior season.

College career
Schlereth attended UNLV for one season as a member of the baseball team, but did not appear in any games. He then transferred to the University of Arizona, where he pitched for three seasons.  During his time at Arizona, he pitched alongside former Detroit Tigers teammate Ryan Perry.

Professional career

Arizona Diamondbacks
Schlereth was drafted by the Oakland Athletics in the 8th round of the 2007 Major League Baseball Draft, but did not sign. He then was drafted by the Arizona Diamondbacks 26th overall in the 2008 Major League Baseball Draft. He made his major league debut in a relief appearance against the Atlanta Braves on May 29, 2009, throwing a perfect inning.

Detroit Tigers
On December 9, 2009 Schlereth and Max Scherzer were traded to the Detroit Tigers as part of a three-team trade that brought Ian Kennedy and Edwin Jackson to the Diamondbacks. Schlereth spent the first half of the 2010 season with the Toledo Mud Hens, posting a 2.83 ERA and 45 strikeouts. He was called up by the Tigers on July 2, 2010 to replace Fu-Te Ni on the roster, who was sent down two days earlier. On August 15, 2011, Schlereth gave up Jim Thome's 600th home run against the Twins at Comerica Park. On November 30, 2012, the Tigers non-tendered Schlereth's contract, making him a free agent. He was then traded back to the Detroit Tigers from the Pittsburgh Pirates for cash, on June 24, 2014 and was assigned to the Detroit Tigers Triple a team, The Toledo Mud Hens.

Baltimore Orioles
On December 19, 2012, Schlereth was signed to minor league deal with the Baltimore Orioles with an invitation to spring training.

Pittsburgh Pirates
Schlereth signed a minor league deal with the Pittsburgh Pirates on December 18, 2013.

Return to Detroit
On June 24, 2014, the Tigers reacquired Schlereth from Pittsburgh in exchange for cash considerations, and was assigned to the Detroit Tigers' Triple-A affiliate, the Toledo Mud Hens. He posted a 4.50 ERA in 17 games with the Mud Hens. On January 14, 2015, the Tigers signed Schlereth to a minor league contract.

Toronto Blue Jays
On January 18, 2016, Schlereth signed a minor league contract with the Toronto Blue Jays. He was released on June 30.

St. Louis Cardinals
On December 12, 2016, Schlereth signed a minor league contract with the St. Louis Cardinals that included an invitation to spring training. He was released on March 27, 2017.

Miami Marlins
On April 9, 2017, Schlereth signed a minor league deal with the Miami Marlins. He elected free agency on November 6, 2017.

Long Island Ducks
On May 6, 2018, Schlereth signed with the Long Island Ducks of the Atlantic League of Professional Baseball.

Seattle Mariners
On June 2, 2018, Schlereth's contract was purchased by the Seattle Mariners. He elected free agency on November 2, 2018.

Boston Red Sox
On January 14, 2019, Schlereth signed a minor league deal with the Boston Red Sox. He was released on March 21, 2019.

Sugar Land Skeeters
On May 31, 2019, Schlereth signed with the Sugar Land Skeeters of the Atlantic League of Professional Baseball. He became a free agent following the season.

Coaching career
On February 21, 2022, Schlereth was named manager for the Joliet Slammers of the Frontier League.

On August 22, 2022, it was announced that Schlereth would be joining Western Michigan University as the team’s pitching coach for the 2023 season.

Personal life
Schlereth's father, Mark, was a professional football player who spent twelve seasons in the NFL with the Washington Redskins and Denver Broncos, and was a starting guard on three Super Bowl championship teams. The elder Schlereth was born and raised in Anchorage and played college football at Idaho; he is currently an NFL analyst on ESPN, and co-host of the morning edition of Denver's sports radio show, 104.3 The Fan.

Schlereth was married on November 14, 2010, to his longtime girlfriend, Breanne Workman, a collegiate gymnast at Arizona. They have two daughters.

Repertoire
Schlereth predominantly is a two-pitch pitcher. He features a curveball in the high 70s  and a fastball in the low 90s.

References

External links

UNLV Rebels bio

1986 births
Living people
Arizona Diamondbacks players
Arizona Wildcats baseball players
Arkansas Travelers players
Baseball players from Alaska
Detroit Tigers players
Indianapolis Indians players
Iowa Cubs players
Jacksonville Jumbo Shrimp players
Jupiter Hammerheads players
Lakeland Flying Tigers players
Long Island Ducks players
Major League Baseball pitchers
Missoula Osprey players
Mobile BayBears players
New Hampshire Fisher Cats players
New Orleans Baby Cakes players
Norfolk Tides players
People from Highlands Ranch, Colorado
Reno Aces players
South Bend Silver Hawks players
Sportspeople from Anchorage, Alaska
Sugar Land Skeeters players
Tacoma Rainiers players
Toledo Mud Hens players
UNLV Rebels baseball players